Missulena pinguipes is a species of mygalomorph spiders in the family Actinopodidae. It is found in Western Australia.

References

pinguipe
Spiders described in 2014